The Unix command , which stands for 'substitute user' (or historically 'superuser'), is used by a computer user to execute commands with the privileges of another user account. When executed it invokes a shell without changing the current working directory or the user environment.

When the command is used without specifying the new user id as a command line argument, it defaults to using the superuser account (user id 0) of the system.

History 
The command , including the Unix permissions system and the setuid system call, was part of Version 1 Unix. Encrypted passwords appeared in Version 3. The command is available as a separate package for Microsoft Windows as part of the UnxUtils collection of native Win32 ports of common GNU Unix-like utilities.

The  command was removed from GNU coreutils as of release 8.18 (2012-08-12) and is currently included in the util-linux package.

Usage 
When run from the command line, su asks for the target user's password, and if authenticated, grants the operator access to that account and the files and directories that account is permitted to access.

john@localhost:~$ su jane
Password:
jane@localhost:/home/john$ exit
logout
john@localhost:~$ 

When used with a hyphen it can be used to start a login shell. In this mode users can assume the user environment of the target user.

john@localhost:~$ su - jane
Password:
jane@localhost:~$

The command sudo is related, and executes a command as another user but observes a set of constraints about which users can execute which commands as which other users (generally in a configuration file named , best editable by the command ). Unlike ,  authenticates users against their own password rather than that of the target user (to allow the delegation of specific commands to specific users on specific hosts without sharing passwords among them and while mitigating the risk of any unattended terminals).

This may or may not mitigate these security concerns, since an intruder might first simply break into one of those accounts. GNU , however, does not support the group wheel for philosophical reasons. Richard Stallman argues that because the group would prevent users from utilizing root passwords leaked to them, the group would allow existing admins to ride roughshod over ordinary users.

See also 
 Unix security
 List of Unix commands
 Comparison of privilege authorization features

Further reading

References

External links 
 su – manual pages from GNU coreutils.
 
 
 
 The su command – by The Linux Information Project (LINFO)

Unix user management and support-related utilities
System administration